Ikram Sehgal is a Pakistani defence analyst and security expert. He is a retired Pakistan Army officer.

Personal life
Sehgal was born to a Punjabi father and Bengali mother. On his mother's side, Bengali politicians Huseyn Shaheed Suhrawardy and J.A. Rahim were his grandmother's first cousins.

Early life and education 
Sehgal spent his entire childhood, adolescence and education in the former East Pakistan, i.e. today's Bangladesh. His father was a commanding officer of the 2nd East Bengal Regiment. When 2nd East Bengal Regiment was in Comilla, he studied in a convent school there. He spent several years of his school life in Comilla. His college life started in Sylhet. His father was then the Sector Commander of EPR in Sylhet. He was admitted to MC College, Sylhet. Later he was admitted to Notre Dame College in Dhaka. From there he joined the Pakistan Military Academy in Kakul in 1964 as a cadet of the 34 PMA Long Course.

Military career

Ikram Sehgal graduated from the Pakistan Military Academy (PMA), Kakul, in October 1965. Commissioned into 2E Bengal (Junior Tigers), he served the regiment till 1968, before qualifying as a pilot in Army Aviation, where he served from 1968 to 1971.

He became a Prisoner of War (POW) in April 1971, while serving in the former East Pakistan and was sent to the Panagarh POW Camp in India. In July 1971, Sehgal escaped from the prison. He became the first Pakistani Prisoner of War to escape from an Indian POW camp.

Sehgal was posted to 44 Punjab (now 4 Sindh) in November 1971. He saw action as company commander in the Thar Desert, receiving a ‘battlefield promotion’ to the rank of major on 13 December 1971. He took part in counter–guerrilla operations in Balochistan in 1973. He later worked as a commercial pilot.

Business career 

He set up a business in 1977, specializing in trading and counter trade. He is currently chairman, Pathfinder Group Pakistan, which includes two of the country's largest private security companies.

Leadership 

Sehgal is also involved in national and international organizations. He is a Member of the World Economic Forum (WEF); International Organization for Migration (IOM); director, East West Institute (EWI), a US-based think-tank; and member, WEF Global Agenda Council (GAC) for counter-terrorism.

Khalid Ahmad wrote in The Express Tribune that he held "outspoken views" on the conduct of the armed forces during the Bangladesh Liberation War, which ultimately led to the secession of East Pakistan.

However, India Today noted that he had written only in 1998:

That was before the Hamoodur Rahman Commission report became public.

Later life

He is a regular contributor of articles in newspapers that include: The News and the Urdu daily Jang. He appears regularly on current affairs programs on television as a ‘defense and security analyst’.

References

External links
 Ikram Sehgal at MBM Holdings

Living people
Punjabi people
Pakistani people of Bengali descent
Pakistan Army Aviation Corps officers
Pakistani military writers
Pakistani prisoners of war
Escapees from Indian detention
Pakistani columnists
Pakistani media personalities
Commercial aviators
1946 births
Lawrence College Ghora Gali alumni
20th-century Bengalis
21st-century Bengalis